Marsilio Landriani (1528–1609) was a Roman Catholic prelate who served as Bishop of Vigevano (1593–1609).

Biography
Marsilio Landriani was born in 1600.
On 10 November 1593, he was appointed by Pope Clement VIII as Bishop of Vigevano.
On 14 November 1593, he was consecrated bishop by Tolomeo Gallio, Cardinal-Bishop of Frascati, with Ludovico de Torres, Archbishop of Monreale, and Owen Lewis, Bishop of Cassano all'Jonio, serving as co-consecrators.

He served as Bishop of Vigevano until his death on 27 August 1609.

While bishop, he was the principal co-consecrator of Giovanni Battista Guanzato, Bishop of Polignano (1598).

References

External links and additional sources
 (for Chronology of Bishops) 
 (for Chronology of Bishops) 

16th-century Italian Roman Catholic bishops
17th-century Italian Roman Catholic bishops
Bishops appointed by Pope Clement VIII
1528 births
1609 deaths